Events (incomplete) which happened on the Italian peninsula in 1266:

Events
 Battle of Benevento

Deaths
 Manfred of Sicily, King of Sicily

References 

Italy
Italy
Years of the 13th century in Italy